Acadie is the debut album by record producer and singer-songwriter Daniel Lanois. It was largely written and recorded in the city of New Orleans. Lanois sings on it in both French and English, sometimes even on the same track. The album was originally released in 1989 (see 1989 in music) on Opal Records and Warner Bros. Records. It was reissued in 2005 with new cover art (but otherwise identical to the original). Acadie was named the 20th greatest Canadian album of all time in Bob Mersereau's 2007 book The Top 100 Canadian Albums.

Track listing
All tracks written by Daniel Lanois unless otherwise noted.
 "Still Water" – 4:29
 "The Maker" – 4:13
 "O Marie" – 3:13
 "Jolie Louise" – 2:41
 "Fisherman's Daughter" – 2:47
 "White Mustang II" (Lanois, Brian Eno) – 2:54
 "Under a Stormy Sky" – 2:20
 "Where the Hawkwind Kills" – 3:51
 "Silium's Hill" – 3:00
 "Ice" – 4:26
 "St. Ann's Gold" (Malcolm Burn, Lanois) – 3:31
 "Amazing Grace" (Traditional, arranged by Lanois, John Newton) – 3:47

With some more songs on the 2005 reissue;

"The Maker" (Early bass and lyrics)
"The Maker" (Calypso demo)
"Still Water" (From Eno's House)
"Jolie Louise" (Before Dublin) 
"Early Dourado Sketch" 
"The Source of Fisherman's Daughter" (Instrumental version)

"Jolie Louise", "Still Water" and "The Maker" were released as singles.

Personnel
 Daniel Lanois – guitar (steel, electric and acoustic), bass, vocals, omnichord
 Malcolm Burn – keyboards, guitars, backing vocals
 Brian Eno – keyboards, vocals
 Tony Hall – bass
 Willie Green – drums
Additional personnel
 Adam Clayton – bass on "Still Water" and "Jolie Louise"
 Larry Mullen, Jr. – drums on "Still Water" and "Jolie Louise" 
 Pierre Marchand – keyboards
 Mason Ruffner – guitar on "Under a Stormy Sky" 
 Roger Eno – piano and synth on "St Ann's Gold" 
 Ed Roth – accordion
 James May – trumpet on "White Mustang II"
 Cyril Neville – percussion
 Art Neville – piano
 Aaron Neville – backing vocals on "The Maker" and vocals on" Amazing Grace" 
 Bill Dillon – guitar
Technical
Mark Howard - recording, mixing
Malcolm Burn - recording,mixing, music consultant 
Brian Eno, Paul Barrett - additional recording
Lynn Goldsmith - front cover photography

Charts

Album

References

External links
 Liner notes
 Lyrics

Daniel Lanois albums
1989 debut albums
Albums produced by Daniel Lanois